Annegret Kober (born 4 June 1957) is a retired German backstroke swimmer who won a bronze medal at the 1972 Summer Olympics in the 4 × 100 m medley relay. In the relay, West Germany used different swimmers in the preliminaries and in the final; Kober swam in the preliminaries. Individually, she finished fourth in the 200 backstroke.

References

1957 births
Living people
German female swimmers
Swimmers at the 1972 Summer Olympics
German female backstroke swimmers
Olympic swimmers of West Germany
Medalists at the 1972 Summer Olympics
Olympic bronze medalists for West Germany
Sportspeople from Siegen
20th-century German women
21st-century German women